George Hobson is a former wrestler from New Zealand.

He competed at the 1950 British Empire Games where he won the bronze medal in the men's lightweight division.

References

Commonwealth Games bronze medallists for New Zealand
Wrestlers at the 1950 British Empire Games
Living people
New Zealand male sport wrestlers
Commonwealth Games medallists in wrestling
Year of birth missing (living people)
20th-century New Zealand people
Medallists at the 1950 British Empire Games